The Producers is a South Korean comedy-drama television series written by Park Ji-eun, and directed by Seo Soo-min and Pyo Min-soo. It stars Cha Tae-hyun, Gong Hyo-jin, Kim Soo-hyun, and Lee Ji-eun. It aired on KBS2 from 15 May to 20 June 2015 on Fridays and Saturdays at 21:15 (KST) for 12 episodes.

Synopsis
In the center of Yeouido is the KBS building. On its sixth floor are partitioned offices where employees work in the network's variety department, keeping hectic schedules of filming, editing and all-night meetings.

Cast

Main
 Kim Soo-hyun as Baek Seung-chan
 Park Sang-hoon as young Seung-chan
An aspiring prosecutor who decides to join KBS because of his secret crush on a KBS employee. He becomes a rookie PD (producer-director) with the variety/entertainment division.
 Lee Ji-eun as Cindy
 Park Seon as young Cindy
 A famous singer and celebrity who debuted as a trainee when she was 13 years old. She is called the "ice princess" for her poker face and complete control over her emotions. As the drama progresses we see hints of a fragile Cindy, she has been keeping for all these years.
 Cha Tae-hyun as Ra Joon-mo
 Gil Jeong-woo as young Joon-mo 
 Chae Sang-woo as teenage Joon-mo 
A seasoned PD who has worked in the industry for ten years. Despite working on a lot of variety programs, he has no single masterpiece to call his own. A two-faced senior.
 Gong Hyo-jin as Tak Ye-jin
 Lee Ji-won as young Ye-jin 
 Ha Seung-ri as teenage Ye-jin
An experienced PD who works on a long-time music program. She is smart, haughty and never holds back in letting people know what she thinks. She uses her high position to abuse newbies.

Supporting
KBS
 Park Hyuk-kwon as Kim Tae-ho, chief producer of the variety department
Kim Jong-kook as Kim Hong-soon, PD of Open Concert
 Seo Ki-chul as Jang In-pyo, director of the variety department
 Ye Ji-won as Go Yang-mi, office manager of the variety department 
 Gi Ju-bong as Park Choon-bong, the president of KBS
 Lee Joo-seung as Kim Joon-bae, floor director of 2 Days & 1 Night. Turns out to be a legendary ghost of KBS.
 Lee Chae-eun as Son Ji-yeon, writer of 2 Days & 1 Night
 Go Bo-gyeol as Wang Min-jung, youngest writer of 2 Days & 1 Night
 Bae Yoo-ram as Ryu Il-yong, assistant director of 2 Days & 1 Night 
 Shin Joo-hwan as Hyung-geun, assistant director of 2 Days & 1 Night 
 Susanna Noh as casting writer of 2 Days & 1 Night 
 Kim Sun-ah as Kim Da-jung, youngest writer of Music Bank
 Jang Seong-beom as assistant PD of Music Bank

Byun Entertainment agency
 Na Young-hee as Byun Mi-sook, CEO of the agency
 Choi Kwon as Cindy's road manager
 Jo Han-chul as Secretary Kim
 Janey as Jini, a trainee of the agency 
 Na Hae-ryung as Yuna, ex-singer of the agency  
 Cho Seung-hee as Yu-ju, member of Pinky4
 Kim Soo-yeon as Christine, member of Pinky4
 Jung Mi-mi as Ha-neul, member of Pinky4
 Park Seo-yeon, young trainee
 Lee Ji-ho as young trainee
 Kim Ye-won as young trainee
 Lee Seo-yeong as young trainee

Baek's Family
Kim Jong-soo as Baek Bo-sun, Seung-chan's father
 Kim Hye-ok as Lee Hoo-nam, Seung-chan's mother
 Park Hee-von as Baek Jae-hee, Seung-chan's older sister
 Park Jong-hwan as Baek Young-chan, Seung-chan's older brother
 Choi Sun-young as Baek Yoo-bin, Seung-chan's younger sister
 Kang Shin-chul as Myung Ji-hoon, Jae-hee's husband

Extended
 Im Ye-jin as Park Bong-soon, Joon-mo's mother
 Kim Hee-chan as Tak Ye-joon, Ye-jin's younger brother
 Jung Han-hee as Kim Tae-ho's daughter
 Yoon Yoo-sun as Kim Tae-ho's wife
 Kim Sa-kwon
 Lee Du-seok
 Jo Chang-geun
 Jin Yong-wook
 Jeon Heon-tae
 Hwang Min-ho
 Ahn Se-ha as manager
 Lee Jeong-ho as Reporter Kang
 Ryu Jun-yeol as Joo Jong-hyun

Special appearances

Episode 1
 Girls' Generation-TTS

Episodes 1–2 (cast members of 2 Days & 1 Night - Season 4)
 Youn Yuh-jung 
 Hwang Shin-hye
 Geum Bo-ra
 Hyun Young

Episodes 1-4
 Jo Yoon-hee as Shin Hae-joo, assistant director on Entertainment Weekly and Seung-chan's crush

Episode 3
 Shin Dong-yup 
 Lee Young-ja
 Cultwo 
 You Hee-yeol 
 Yoon Jong-shin 
 Jo Jung-chi 
 Jun Hyun-moo 
 Ahn Hee-yeon
 Nichkhun
 Jackson Wang
 Jo Kwon
 Sunmi 
 Hong Kyung-min 
 Jang Hyuk as Jang Hyun-sung, Ye-jin's ex-boyfriend
 Lee Chun-hee as Lee Min-chul, Ye-jin's ex-boyfriend

Episodes 3–4
 Park Jin-young

Episodes 4–5, 12 (cast members of 2 Days & 1 Night – Season 5)
 Sandara Park
 Minwoo
 Kim Ji-soo

Episodes 4–5, 10, 12 (cast members of 2 Days & 1 Night – Season 5)
 Kang Seung-yoon
 Kim Min-jae

Episode 5
 Yoo Ho-jin as PD of 2 Days & 1 Night – Season 3

Episode 6
 Lee Seung-gi
 Norazo

Episode 8
 Go Ara

Episode 9
 K.Will 
 Park Bo-gum
 Monsta X
 Kim Ryeo-wook

Episode 10
 Jung Joon-young as Cindy's anti-fan
 Roy Kim as Cindy's anti-fan
 Seol In-ah as Cindy's anti-fan
 Seo Kyung-seok as Cindy's lawyer fan

Episode 12
 Song Hae
 Kim Saeng-min

Production

Development and filming
The Producers was dubbed as  "the most anticipated show" of 2015 because it served reunion between the actor Kim Soo-hyun and the screenwriter Park Ji-eun after the pan-Asia successful television series My Love from the Star (2013–14). The series was produced by KBS's entertainment department instead of the drama department and was helmed by director Seo Soo-min, whose past experience has been on variety shows. It was also the first terrestrial network drama to air in the Friday–Saturday time slot.

First script reading was held on 23 March 2015 in Gangnam District, Seoul, with no media presence. The first day shooting was held on April 1, 2015 on the 6th floor of the KBS building in Yeouido. Official posters for the drama were unveiled on 29 April 2015.

Soundtrack

Notes
 Included in the special edition physical album only.

Chart performance

Reception

Commercial performance
Yonhap News Agency reported The Producers would earn  according to the broadcaster and industry sources. Also, it was sold to 12 Asian countries at high prices. However, KBS officials said that it would log lower-than-expected profits due to rise in initial production cost stating various reasons including the change of producer in the middle of the series.

Critical response
The Producers drew a solid average viewership rating of 12.5% and topped the Content Power Index (CPI) rankings.

The Producers received mixed critical response. Kwon Ji-youn writing for The Korea Times called the premier of drama "great boast and small roast" reasoning that despite having "an all-star cast, impressive cameos and an original setting and plot" the drama was "nothing out of the ordinary." She praised Kim Soo-hyun's acting calling the transformation from his former character on My Love from the Star "striking" and he and Gong Hyo-jin were only able to pull off humour scenes. It also received criticism from entertainment industry insiders regarding its verisimilitude, particularly in the drama's depiction of producers as the weaker party in dealing with celebrities, which they claimed is "highly unrealistic" unless top stars are involved.

Viewership
In this table,  represent the lowest ratings and  represent the highest ratings.

Awards and nominations

Notes

References

External links
  
 
 
 

2015 South Korean television series debuts
2015 South Korean television series endings
Korean Broadcasting System television dramas
Korean-language television shows
Television series about television
Television series about show business
Television shows set in Seoul
Television series produced in Seoul
South Korean comedy-drama television series
Television series by Chorokbaem Media
Television shows written by Park Ji-eun